A by-election was to be held for the New South Wales Legislative Assembly electorate of Armidale on 18 September 1915 because of the death of Liberal Reform member George Braund who was killed in action at Gallipoli.

Dates

Result

George Braund was killed in action at Gallipoli.

See also
Electoral results for the district of Armidale
List of New South Wales state by-elections

References

1915 elections in Australia
New South Wales state by-elections
1910s in New South Wales